The 12th Smule Mirchi Music Awards or simply Mirchi Music Awards 2020, was the 12th edition of the Mirchi Music Awards and took place on 19 February 2020. The award ceremony was hosted by Aparshakti Khurana, Neeti Mohan, and Shekhar Ravjiani at Yash Raj Studios, Mumbai. The title sponsor was Smule, replacing Pepsi.

Winners and nominees
Winners are indicated in bold.

Song of the year
 Kalank (Title track) by Arijit Singh
 "Chashni" by Abhijeet Srivastava
 "Apna Time Aayega" by Ranveer Singh
 "Tujhe Kitna Chahne Lage" by Arijit Singh
 "Challa" by  Romy, Shashwat Sachdev & Vivek Hariharan
 "Ghungroo" by Arijit Singh & Shilpa Rao

Album of the Year
 Kesari - Arko Pravo Mukherjee, Chirrantan Bhatt, Gurmoh, Jasbir Jassi, Jasleen Royal, Tanishk Bagchi, Kumaar, Kunwar Juneja, Manoj Muntashir
 Bharat - Vishal–Shekhar, Ali Abbas Zafar, Julius Packiam, Irshad Kamil
 Gully Boy - Ankur Tewari, Divine, Dub Sharma, Ishq Bector, Jasleen Royal, Ace aka Mumbai, Chandrashekar Kunder (Major C), Hardeep, Kaam Bhaari, Karsh Kale, Midival Punditz, Mikey McCleary, Naezy, Prem, Sez on the Beat, Raghu Dixit, Rishi Rich, Spitfire & Viveick Rajagopalan, Javed Akhtar, 100 RBH, Aditya Sharma, Arjun, Bhinder Khanpuri, Blitz, Desi Ma, Gaurav Raina, Maharya, MC Altaf, MC TodFod, MC Mawali, Noxious D, Tapan Raj, D-Cypher, BeatRaw
 Kabir Singh - Akhil Sachdeva, Amaal Mallik, Mithoon, Sachet–Parampara & Vishal Mishra, Irshad Kamil, Kumaar, Manoj Muntashir
 Kalank - Pritam, Amitabh Bhattacharya

Listeners Choice Song of the Year
 Bekhayali by Sachet Tandon
 "Slow Motion" by Shreya Ghoshal & Nakash Aziz
 "Apna Time Aayega" by Ranveer Singh & Divine
 "Ve Maahi" by Arijit Singh & Asees Kaur
 "Coca Cola Tu" by Neha Kakkar & Tony Kakkar (rap by: Young Desi)

Listeners Choice Album of the Year
 Kabir Singh
 Bharat
 Gully Boy
 Kalank
 Kesari

Listeners Choice Independent Music Category
 "Vaaste" by Dhvani Bhanushali
 "Dheeme Dheeme" by Tony Kakkar
 "Lehenga" by Jass Manak
 "Makhna" by Honey Singh & Neha Kakkar
 "Paagal" by Badshah

Male Vocalist of the Year
 Arijit Singh - "Kalank" from Kalank
 Arijit Singh - "Tujhe Kitna Chahne Lage" from Kabir Singh
 Ranveer Singh & Divine - "Apna Time Ayega" from Gully Boy
 B Praak - "Teri Mitti" from Kesari
 Romy, Vivek Hariharan, Shashwat Sachdev - "Challa" from Uri: The Surgical Strike

Female Vocalist of the Year
 Shreya Ghoshal for "Ghar More Pardesiya"
 Neha Bhasin for "Chashni"
 Parampara Thakur for "Mere Sohneya"
 Shreya Ghoshal for "Tabaah Ho Gaye"
 Shilpa Rao for "Ghungroo"

Music Composer of the Year
 Pritam - "Kalank" from Kalank
 Sachet–Parampara - "Bekhayali" from Kabir Singh
 Mithoon - "Tujhe Kitna Chahne Lage" from Kabir Singh
 Pritam - "Ghar More Pardesiya" from Kalank
 Shashwat Sachdev - "Beh Chala" from Uri: The Surgical Strike

Lyricist of the Year
 Amitabh Bhattacharya - "Kalank" from Kalank
 Irshad Kamil - "Bekhayali" from Kabir Singh
 Manoj Muntashir - "Teri Mitti" from Kesari
 Prasoon Joshi - "Bharat" from Manikarnika: The Queen of Jhansi
 Raj Shekhar - "Beh Chala" from Uri: The Surgical Strike

Upcoming Male Vocalist of the Year
 Abhijeet Srivastava for "Chashni"
 Amit Gupta for "Radhe Radhe"
 Divne, Naezy & Ranveer Singh for "Mere Gully Mein"
 Shantanu Sudame for "Manzar Hai Yeh Naya"

Upcoming Female Vocalist of the Year
 Aakanksha Sharma for "Tum Chale Gaye"
 Swati Mehul for "Naah Goriye"
 Hriti Tikadar for "Jiya"
 Deepanshi Nagar for "Mann Mein Shiva"
 Sarodee Borah for "Sapne Jo Bhi"

Upcoming Lyricist of the Year
 Sahib for "Lahu Ka Rang Kara"
 Bharaga v Purohit for "Bala song"
 Ari Leff, Michael Pollack & Gurpreet Saini for "Dil Na Jaaneya"
 Splitfire" for "Asli Hip Hop"
 Divne & Naezy for "Mere Gully Mein"

Upcoming Music Composer
 Piyush Shankar for "Naina Yeh"
 Splitfire for "Asli Hip Hop"
 Divine, Naezy & Sez for "Mere Gully Mein"
 Gurmoh for "Deh Shiva"
 Payal Dev for "Tum Hi Aana"
 Shidharth Bhavsar for "Aaj Jage Rahna"
 Sanjoy Bose for "Ore Chanda"

Recreated Song of the Year
 "Hume Tumse Pyar Kitana" by Shreya Ghoshal
 "O Saki Saki" by B Praak, Tulsi Kumar & Neha Kakkar
 "Akhiyon Se Golu Maare" by Mika Singh & Tulsi Kumar
 "The Jawani Song" by Payal Dev & Vishal Dadlani
 "Mungda" by Jyotica Tangri, Shaan & Subhro Ganguly

Independent Music Category
 Jaan Meri by Anuradha Palakurtihi
 "Awaara Shaam Hai" by Piyush Mehroliya
 "Filhall" by B Praak
 "Ishq Ne" by Anuradha Palakurtihi
 "Woh Baarishein" by Arjun Kanungo

 Source - E Times

Jury

Screening Jury

Grand Jury

Source - E Times

Special Awards

Jury Award for Outstanding Contribution to Hindi Film Music
 Amar Haldipur

Lifetime Achievement Award / K. L. Saigal Sangeet Shehenshah Award
 Usha Mangeshkar

Special Jury Award for Golden Era Album of the Year (1959)
 Anari & Sujatha for 1959

Best Raag Inspired Song of the Year
 "Dhola" from Yeh Hai India

Make It Large Award
 Deepika Padukone

Mirchi Social Media Icon of the Year
 Neha Kakkar

Mirchi Trendsetters Album of the year
 Gully Boy

Technical Awards

Song Producer - Programming and Arranging
 DJ Phukan, Prasad Sashte, Prakash Peters & Sunny MR for the song "Ghar More Pardesiya"

Song Engineer - Recording and Mixing
 Vijay Dayal for the song "Jugaarafiya"

Background Score
 Mangesh Dhakde for Article 15

See also
Mirchi Music Awards

References and sources

External links

Mirchi Music Awards